Overland Park Regional Medical Center is a 343-bed acute care hospital located in Overland Park, Kansas. It is part of the HCA Midwest Division.

History
Overland Park Regional Medical Center first opened in December 1978. In 2002, HCA Inc. announced their purchase of Health Midwest, which included Overland Park Regional Medical Center. In 2014, the hospital completed a $120 million expansion that included a new emergency department and trauma center, a three-story patient tower, and a new parking garage.

Facilities
The campus includes the main hospital building, doctors' building, outpatient clinics, and a parking garage. Available facilities include an emergency department and level II trauma center, dedicated pediatric emergency department, catheterization laboratory, intensive care unit, labor and delivery, level III neonatal intensive care unit (NICU), and outpatient care.

References

Hospitals in Kansas
Buildings and structures in Overland Park, Kansas
HCA Healthcare
Hospital buildings completed in 1978
Hospitals established in 1978
Trauma centers